Shewanella aestuarii is a Gram-negative, non-spore-forming, facultatively anaerobic, rod-shaped and motile bacterium with a polar flagellum from the genus of Shewanella which has been isolated from tidal flat from the Suncheon bay on Korea.

References

External links
Type strain of Shewanella aestuarii at BacDive -  the Bacterial Diversity Metadatabase

Alteromonadales
Bacteria described in 2013